Virgin Australia (known as Virgin Blue until early 2011) is an Australian airline, with headquarters in Brisbane, Australia. A number of hubs are located throughout Australia.

Virgin Australia previously suspended flights from 30 March 2020 to all international destinations "in response to expanded government travel restrictions and increased impacts from COVID-19 on travel demand", as well as several destinations in Australia.

Destinations

Virgin Australia (and Virgin Australia Regional Airlines) currently serve 32 domestic and 5 international destinations as of January 2023:

Codeshare & interline agreements
Currently, Virgin Australia has interline agreements with Alaska Airlines (to Seattle–Tacoma); Delta Air Lines; and Horizon Air (to Portland). 

It was announced on 26 August 2010 that Virgin Australia had signed a codeshare and interline agreement with Etihad Airways, giving Virgin passengers access to 65 destinations in Europe and the Middle East. 

Virgin America and Virgin Australia International Airlines shared terminal facilities at Los Angeles International Airport's Terminal 3, however, only the check-in desks are located there, both inbound and outbound Virgin Australia flights arrive and depart from the Tom Bradley International Terminal.

United Airlines and Virgin Australia announced on 15th December 2021 that beginning in April 2022, a new partnership between the two would see the longer than a decade partnership with Delta Air Lines would be scrapped.

References

External links
Virgin Australia Main Site

Lists of airline destinations